Linzolo is a small town and suburb of Brazzaville in the Pool Department of the Republic of Congo.

History
The town of Linzolo, located 20 km south of Brazzaville and the Livingstone Falls on the Cataractes plateau on the west side of the river,  was the chosen site between 1881 and 1883 for the founding of the oldest Catholic Mission in the Congo with that of Loango. The Mission of Linzolo was created on  September 22, 1883, and the chapel completed in 1885. It was the oldest building in the country, but was unfortunately destroyed by fire in recent years. A modern chapel with carved reliefs replaced it.

References

Populated places in the Republic of the Congo